Katherine L.F. Grose (born 7 February 1959) is a retired British rower, who competed at the 1988 Summer Olympics and the 1992 Summer Olympics.

Rowing career
Gross took up rowing while at Cambridge University in 1978. Six years later she was in the women's boat race rowing for the blue boat when studying for a post graduate architecture diploma and was part of the Cambridge boat that won the eight at the 1984 National Championships.

She represented England and won a silver medal in the eight, at the 1986 Commonwealth Games in Edinburgh and competed in the 1986 World Rowing Championships.

The following year she was a member of the eight that won the national title rowing for a A.R.A squad at the 1987 National Championships and rowed in her second World Championships in Copenhagen. She was selected to represent Great Britain in the women's coxed four event at the 1988 Olympic Games in Seoul. The team which consisted of Grose, Joanne Gough, Fiona Johnston, Susan Smith and Alison Norrish finished in sixth place.

Grose competed in both the 1989 and 1990 World Championships and was part of the coxless fours with Miriam Batten, Kareen Marwick and Caroline Christie that won the national title rowing for the British squad at the 1990 National Championships.

In 1992 she was selected to represent Great Britain in her second Olympics, in the women's eight event at the 1992 Olympic Games in Barcelona. The team which consisted of Grose, Rachel Hirst, Fiona Freckleton, Philippa Cross, Dot Blackie, Susan Smith, Kareen Marwick, Katharine Brownlow and Alison Paterson finished in seventh place.

References

External links
 

1959 births
Living people
British female rowers
Olympic rowers of Great Britain
Rowers at the 1988 Summer Olympics
Rowers at the 1992 Summer Olympics
People from Haverhill, Suffolk
Commonwealth Games medallists in rowing
Commonwealth Games silver medallists for England
Rowers at the 1986 Commonwealth Games
Medallists at the 1986 Commonwealth Games